Roy Harrison McVicker (February 20, 1924 – September 15, 1973) was a U.S. Representative from Colorado.

Early life and education
Born in Edgewater, Colorado, his parents were Reverend and Mrs. Roy H. McVicker. McVicker was educated at South Denver High School, University of Denver, Columbia College, and graduated from Columbia Law School in 1950.
He was a lay preacher in the Methodist Church beginning at eighteen years of age.

World War II
During the Second World War, he served in the United States Navy in the Southwest Pacific.

Career
He served as assistant professor in psychology at Colorado State College in 1946 and 1947. He worked under President Harry Truman in establishment of the Admiral Nimitz Commission on Internal Security and Civil Rights in 1950 and 1951.

He was admitted to the bar in New York in 1950, and practiced law in Wheat Ridge, Colorado from 1953 to 1964. He served as member of the State senate from 1956 to 64.

Mcvicker was narrowly elected as a Democrat to the Eighty-ninth Congress (January 3, 1965 – January 3, 1967). He was an unsuccessful candidate for reelection in 1966 to the Ninetieth Congress.

He was a contract consultant for the Agency for International Development in Denver, Colorado, 1967. He resumed the practice of law.

Personal life
He married Harriet Ripley and they had one child together, Elizabeth. He adopted Harriet’s children from a previous marriage, William and Theresa. They divorced in 1968. Both Harriet and Roy remarried. He married a woman named Mary.

He died of an incurable spinal column disease at his home in Westminster, Colorado on September 15, 1973. Documents from the Boulder Daily Camera are stored at the Carnegie Library in Boulder.

References

1924 births
1973 deaths
People from Jefferson County, Colorado
Columbia Law School alumni
United States Navy personnel of World War II
Democratic Party members of the United States House of Representatives from Colorado
American Methodist clergy
Colorado State University faculty
Democratic Party Colorado state senators
Neurological disease deaths in Colorado
Deaths from motor neuron disease
20th-century American politicians
Columbia College (New York) alumni
20th-century American clergy